Jhadupudi is a small village in Kanchili mandal of Srikakulam District in Andhra Pradesh. It is located in between the small towns Sompeta and Ichchapuram.

Geography
It has an average elevation of 42 meters (141 feet).

Demographics
 Indian census, the demographic details of Jadupudi village is as follows:
 Total Population: 	2,625 in 617 Households
 Male Population: 	1,180 and Female Population: 	1,445
 Children Under 6-years of age: 440 (Boys - 218 and Girls - 222)
 Total Literates: 	1,184

Transport
Jhadupudi railway station is situated on Khurda Road–Visakhapatnam section, part of the Howrah-Chennai main line under Khurda Road railway division of East Coast Railway zone.also bus transport

References

Villages in Srikakulam district